El fin de la comedia is a Spanish comedy television series starring Ignatius Farray. Its two seasons were originally aired in 2014 and 2017, respectively.

Premise 
The plot of the first season follows the life of the comedian Ignatius Farray as a divorced father facing a midlife crisis. In the second season Farray suffers from a life-changing illness.

Cast 
Starring Ignatius Farray, the series features supporting performances and cameos from the likes of Joaquín Reyes, Buenafuente, Luis Bermejo, Iñaki Gabilondo, Verónica Forqué, Ernesto Sevilla, Natalia de Molina, Víctor Clavijo, Juanra Bonet, Clara Sanchís, Willy Toledo, Julián Villagrán, El Chojin, Kaco Forns, Lalo Tenorio, Javier Botet, and David Broncano.

Production and release 
El fin de la comedia was created by Ignatius Farray, Miguel Esteban and Raúl Navarro. The first season was produced by Comedy Central in collaboration with Sayaka. The episodes were directed by Miguel Esteban and Raúl Navarro.
The 6-episode first season premiered on Comedy Central on 7 November 2014. Produced by Comedy Central in collaboration with Movistar+, the second season was released under video-on-demand by Movistar+ in 2017 prior to its airing on Comedy Central.

Season 1

Season 2

Awards and nominations 

|-
| align = "center" | 2015 || 3rd  || Best Comedy Actor || Ignatius Farray ||  || 
|-
| align = "center" rowspan = "2" | 2018 || 6th Feroz Awards || colspan = "2" | Best Comedy Series ||  || 
|-
| 46th International Emmy Awards || colspan = "2" | Best Comedy Series ||  || 
|}

See also 
 Louie (American TV series)

References 

2010s Spanish comedy television series
2014 Spanish television series debuts
2017 Spanish television series endings
2010s black comedy television series
Television series about comedians